The Ouachita River Unit is a prison in Malvern, Arkansas, operated by the Arkansas Department of Correction.  The prison opened in 2003.

History
In 2012, a special needs unit was opened which included a 72-bed hospital, and a 40-bed special services area which included a barracks for elderly, chronically ill and acute-illness inmates.

Over 4000 prisoners-per-year in Arkansas are studying to receive their GED.  Each May, prisoners who have earned their GED are brought to the Ouachita River Unit for a graduation ceremony.

Operations

 inmate intake
 special needs unit
 regional maintenance
 garment processing
 construction
 reduction of sexual victimization program
 substance abuse education
 livestock and forage production
 education
 chaplaincy services
 gravel harvesting
 Paws in Prison program

References

External links
Ouachita River Unit

Prisons in Arkansas
2003 establishments in Arkansas
Malvern, Arkansas